The 2010 FedEx Cup Playoffs, the series of four golf tournaments that determined the season champion on the U.S.-based PGA Tour, began on August 26 and ended on September 26. It included the following four events:
The Barclays — Ridgewood Country Club, Paramus, New Jersey
Deutsche Bank Championship — TPC Boston, Norton, Massachusetts
BMW Championship — Cog Hill Golf & Country Club, Lemont, Illinois
The Tour Championship — East Lake Golf Club, Atlanta, Georgia

These were the fourth FedEx Cup playoffs since their inception in 2007.

The point distributions can be seen here.

Regular season rankings

The Barclays
The Barclays was played August 26–29. Of the 125 players eligible to play in the event, three did not enter: Paul Goydos (ranked 63), Sergio García (101), and Corey Pavin (110). Jim Furyk was disqualified from the tournament for missing his pro-am tee time. Of the 121 entrants, 72 made the second-round cut at even-par 141.

Matt Kuchar won by making a birdie on the first hole of a sudden-death playoff with Martin Laird and moved to first place in the standings. The top 100 players in the points standings advanced to the Deutsche Bank Championship.

Deutsche Bank Championship
The Deutsche Bank Championship was played September 3–6. Of the 100 players eligible to play in the event, one did not enter: Kenny Perry. Of the 99 entrants, 72 made the second-round cut at one-under-par, 141.

Charley Hoffman shot a final round 62 to win by five strokes and move to second place in the standings. The top 70 players in the points standings advanced to the BMW Championship.

BMW Championship
The BMW Championship was played September 9–12. All 70 players eligible to play in the event did so. There was no cut. The top 30 players in FedEx Cup points after this event advanced to the Tour Championship and also earned spots in the 2011 Masters, U.S. Open, and (British) Open Championship.

Dustin Johnson won the event by one stroke over Paul Casey and moved to second in the rankings. Former FedEx Cup winners Tiger Woods (2007 and 2009) and Vijay Singh (2008) finished 42nd and 57th, respectively, on the points list and did not advance to The Tour Championship.

With the FedEx Cup points reset after the BMW Championship, all 30 remaining players had at least a mathematical chance to secure the season crown, and any of the top five players could claim the FedEx Cup with a win in The Tour Championship.

Reset points
The points were reset after the BMW Championship.

The Tour Championship
The Tour Championship was played September 23–26, after a one-week break. All 30 golfers who qualified for the tournament played, and there was no cut. Jim Furyk won the tournament and the FedEx Cup.

Final leaderboard

For the full list see here.

Table of qualifying players
Table key:

* First-time Playoffs participant

References

FedEx Cup
FedEx Cup Playoffs